Mother Teresa Mission Higher Secondary School is a co-educational school in Kanpur, Uttar Pradesh, India. It has three branches in Kanpur: Kidwai Nagar Branch, Koyla Nagar Branch and Krishna Nagar Branch. 

The school was established by Late Balraj Anand Silas and Dr. Veena Silas in 1995. It is affiliated with the Council for the Indian School Certificate Examinations and provides education to students from kindergarten to grade 12.

Location
Mother Teresa Mission Higher Secondary School is located near Swatantara Senani Marg, Micky House, Kanpur, Uttar Pradesh. Its Second branch is located in Koyla Nagar and third in Krishna Nagar.

References
Review by Eduvidya.com
Review on Justdial
icbse

External links
Official Website
Facebook Page

Educational institutions established in 1995
Schools in Kanpur
1995 establishments in Uttar Pradesh